Dennis Arlen Wainwright  (born 17 November 1935) is a Bermudian former cricketer who played as a right-handed batsman and a wicket-keeper. He played one first-class cricket match for Bermuda against New Zealand in 1972. It was the maiden first-class match to be played by the Bermuda cricket team. As well as playing cricket, Wainwright was the goalkeeper for the Bermuda national football team.

Wainwright was born in Bermuda in 1935 and grew up in the Flatts area of the island. He was educated at Harrington Sound and played island cricket for the Flatts side and for St Georges Cricket Club, opening the batting and captaining the side for a period. He played from 1957 until at least 1984, including playing non-first-class matches against a numbering of touring international and English county sides and touring England, Canada and North America with Bermuda Wanders. On a tour of England in 1961 he was part of an opening partnership with Sheridan Raynor of 253 runs against an English Counties XI.

After retirement he remained involved in St Georges' cricket and was awarded an MBE in the 2005 Birthday Honours for services to sport and community on Bermuda.

Notes

References

External links

1935 births
Living people
Bermudian cricketers
Bermudian footballers
Bermuda international footballers
Association football goalkeepers
Wicket-keepers